David Ondříček (born 23 June 1969) is a Czech film director, screenwriter and producer. His 2012 film In the Shadow won nine Czech Lion Awards.

Selected filmography

External links
 

1969 births
Living people
Film directors from Prague